Auerstedt  is a village and a former municipality in the Weimarer Land district of Thuringia, Germany. Since 31 December 2012, it is part of the town Bad Sulza. On October 14, 1806, the Battle of Jena-Auerstedt, a decisive victory for Napoleon I of France, took place near Auerstedt. As a result, the leader of the victorious French forces, Louis-Nicolas Davout, was appointed Duc d'Auerstaedt.

References

Former municipalities in Thuringia